Szandra Lajtos (pronounced ; born 22 July 1986 in Szeged) is a Hungarian short track speed skater.

Her first major championship was the 2002 Winter Olympic Games in Salt Lake City, where she participated at the age of 15, being the youngest member of the Hungarian delegation, and also the youngest competitor in short track speed skating. Lajtos ran in two distances, finishing 28th in 500 metres and 19th in the 1,000 metres event.

Among her best results are a silver medal in the 3000 metres relay from the 2011 European Championship and two bronze medals in the same event from 2006 and 2012.

Lajtos was also member of the Hungarian relay team at the 2011 Winter Universiade, where they came third behind South Korea and China.

Personal records
As of 8 March 2012

References

External links
 Biography at the International Skating Union

1986 births
Living people
Sportspeople from Szeged
Hungarian female short track speed skaters
Olympic short track speed skaters of Hungary
Short track speed skaters at the 2002 Winter Olympics
Short track speed skaters at the 2014 Winter Olympics
Universiade medalists in short track speed skating
Universiade bronze medalists for Hungary
Competitors at the 2011 Winter Universiade
21st-century Hungarian women